Hispomorpha horrida is a species of beetle in the family Cerambycidae, and the only species in the genus Hispomorpha. It was described by Newman in 1842.

References

Apomecynini
Beetles described in 1842